Spirituality and Distortion is the fourth album by Gautier Serre, under his alias Igorrr, released on Metal Blade Records on 27 March 2020.

Track listing

Personnel

Igorrr
 Gautier Serre – electric guitar, keyboards, programming, composition, recording, mixing, mastering, production

Additional musicians
 Laurent Lunoir – vocals 
 Laure Le Prunenec – vocals
 Sylvain Bouvier – drums, percussion
 Benjamin Baŕdiaux – harpsichord 
 Erlend Caspersen – bass
 Mike Leon – bass 
 George Fisher – vocals 
 Diego Delgadillo – lyrics 
 Fotini-Asineth Kokkala – qanun
 Alexandre Peronny – cello
 Mehdi Haddab – oud
 Pierre Mussi – accordion
 Antony Miranda – sitar, percussion
 Nils Cheville – classical guitar
 Martyn Clément – electric guitar
 Matt Lebofsky – piano
 Benjamin Violet – strings
 Timba Harris – strings

Technical personnel
 Arthur Paiz, Erik Rutan, Hervé Faivre – recording
 Førtifem – artwork
 Jon Herrera – piano recording

Charts

References

Metal Blade Records albums
2020 albums
Igorrr albums